SMN may refer to:

Lemhi County Airport, IATA airport code of SMN
Netherland Line (Stoomvaart Maatschappij Nederland)
Seri Maharaja Mangku Negara, a Malaysian honour
S-m-n theorem, a computability theorem regarding programming languages
Servicio Meteorológico Nacional (Mexico), Mexico's National Meteorological Service
Servicio Militar Nacional, Mexico's National Military Service
Société Métallurgique de Normandie, a steel mill in Caen, Normandy, France
Stathmin protein
Satellite Music Networks, a US radio network
Inari Sámi language
Survival of motor neuron protein, a protein complex